KGGN (102.5 FM) is a Christian Contemporary radio station licensed to the Cornerstone Church of Hemet, California, serving that community and the Inland Empire region of California.

History

References

External links
 

2018 establishments in California
Mass media in Riverside County, California
Radio stations established in 2018
GGN